Meimuna kurowae is a species of cicada in the family Cicadidae found in Japan.

Description
This cicada is allied to Meimuna ogasawarensis from which it differs slightly in appearance. M. kurowae has a smaller, less prominent face with a black stripe in the middle. It has a more distinctly narrow opercula. Its tibia is tinted brown at the apex. Its tegmina is narrower and its genital plate is dark-colored.
Excluding the tegmina, the males are approximately 29 mm long, and the females are 32/35 mm long.

Habitat
Found on Ryukyu Islands.

Life cycle
Their median life cycle from egg to natural adult death is around two years. However, their life cycle can range from two years to four years.

References

Cicadas